San Miguel (also known as Volcán Chaparrastique) is a stratovolcano in central-eastern El Salvador, approximately  southwest of the city of San Miguel. On January 16, 2002, a minor eruption of steam, gas, and ash occurred from the summit crater, lasting 3 hours but causing no real damage to life or property. Carbon dioxide emissions had been monitored since November 2001, and their steady increase continued to build up until the eruption.

Twelve years later, on December 29, 2013, San Miguel erupted at 10:30 local time spewing ash and smoke into the sky, and prompted the evacuation of thousands of people living in a 3 km (1.9 mi) radius around the volcano. It was preceded and caused by increased seismic activity beginning at 06:30 local time.

See also
 List of volcanoes in El Salvador
 List of stratovolcanoes

Gallery

References

External links
 

Mountains of El Salvador
Stratovolcanoes of El Salvador
Active volcanoes
Protected areas of El Salvador